Caddo Hills School District 28  is a public school district based in unincorporated Montgomery County, Arkansas, United States, with a Norman mailing address. The district encompasses  of land of Montgomery County, including all or portions of the municipalities of Norman and Black Springs, along with small pieces of Glenwood. It also includes unincorporated areas of Caddo Gap,

The district was formed in 1971 when the Norman and Caddo Gap School Districts consolidated. In the 1971-72 and 1972-73 school years, high school classes were held at the old Norman High School. In 1973, a new high school was built on land between the two communities on Highway 8. In 1974, the Caddo Hills Elementary School was opened at the same location. Both the high school and elementary buildings have had several additions built on in the last 40 years. The district's gymnasium was built in 1984-85.

Schools 
 Caddo Hills High School, serving more than 250 students in grades 7 through 12.
 Caddo Hills Ełementary School, serving more than 300 students in prekindergarten through grade 6.

References

Further reading
 (Download) - Includes maps of predecessor districts

External links
 Official website

Education in Montgomery County, Arkansas
School districts in Arkansas
1971 establishments in Arkansas
School districts established in 1971